Mal Papradnik is a village in the municipality of Centar Župa, North Macedonia.

Demographics
Mal Papradnik has traditionally been inhabited by a Muslim Macedonian speaking (Torbeš) population.
 
According to the 2002 census, the village had a total of 486 inhabitants. Ethnic groups in the village include:

Turks 455 
Macedonians 25
Others 6

References

Villages in Centar Župa Municipality
Macedonian Muslim villages
Turkish communities in North Macedonia